José Carlos de Carvalho Júnior (2 September 1847 – 28 February 1934) was a Brazilian rear admiral and politician in the Empire of Brazil, best known for his service in the Paraguayan War and his role in the expedition carried out to the interior of Bahia in 1887 to recover the Bendegó meteorite from where it had been laying for more than a hundred years since the first attempt to remove it made in 1785 and transport it to the court in Rio de Janeiro.

Gallery

References

Brazilian admirals
1847 births
1934 deaths